The DC Extended Universe (DCEU) is an American media franchise and shared universe centered on a series of superhero films and television series produced by DC Studios and distributed by Warner Bros. Pictures. It is based on characters that appear in American comic books published by DC Comics. The DCEU also includes comic books, short films, novels, and video games. Like the original DC Universe in comic books, the DCEU was established by crossing over common plot elements, settings, cast, and characters.

Warner Bros. had plans to bring various DC Comics superheroes together in films since 2002, when Wolfgang Petersen was set to direct a crossover of the Superman and Batman film franchises. After a planned Justice League film was put on hold in 2008 and initial universe plans were scrapped due to the critical and commercial disappointment of the 2011 film Green Lantern, Warner Bros. established this shared universe in 2013.

The DCEU began with the film Man of Steel (2013), a reboot of the Superman film series, followed by Batman v Superman: Dawn of Justice (2016), which served as a reboot of the Batman film series. These films were followed by more than a dozen films, and was expanded to include television series for the streaming service HBO Max in 2022, beginning with Peacemaker. Following the restructuring of DC Studios and the appointment of James Gunn and Peter Safran in 2022, the franchise will be largely rebooted with the release of The Flash, leading into the DC Universe films and television series planned by Gunn and Safran.

The DCEU is the ninth-highest-grossing film franchise of all time, having grossed over $6.2 billion at the global box office. Its highest-grossing film, Aquaman, earned over $1.15 billion worldwide and became the highest-grossing DC Comics-based film to date. Reception to the franchise has generally been mixed among critics and fans.

Etymology 
Upon announcement of the film series, the universe was commonly called the "DC Cinematic Universe" (DCCU) by fans and the media, in keeping with the naming convention of the already established Marvel Cinematic Universe (MCU). Keith Staskiewicz, writing for Entertainment Weekly, jokingly coined the term "DC Extended Universe" (DCEU) in an article about Batman v Superman: Dawn of Justice on July 1, 2015. This term and the abbreviation DCEU quickly spread among the press and fans who took it as the official name of the franchise over the following years. According to Vulture writer Abraham Riesman, DC confirmed to him in September 2017 that the term was not used internally and they did not consider it official.

In 2016, as part of DC Films Presents: Dawn of the Justice League, both Geoff Johns and Kevin Smith referred to the franchise's name as being the "Justice League Universe". During the DC Films panel at San Diego Comic-Con 2018, a video banner displayed the words "Welcome to the Worlds of DC", after showcasing some upcoming films. As a result, some media outlets interpreted this as DC officially naming their shared film universe as the "Worlds of DC". However, in March 2020, Jim Lee referred to the franchise as the DC Extended Universe at C2E2. The franchise was officially titled DC Extended Universe when the WarnerMedia streaming service HBO Max launched the following May.

Following the appointment of Peter Safran and James Gunn as heads of DC Studios, Warner Bros. Discovery (created from the merger between WarnerMedia and Discovery Inc.) referred to DC's film and television series as part of the "DC Universe" (DCU), which some media outlets interpreted as a rebranding of the DCEU.

Development 

In 2002, Wolfgang Petersen was set to direct a Batman vs. Superman film from a script by Akiva Goldsman, but the project was shelved by Warner Bros. in order to focus on individual Superman and Batman projects. In 2008, a planned Justice League film directed by George Miller was placed on indefinite hold after it failed to secure tax breaks for filming in Australia. Man of Steel, a reboot of the Superman film series released in 2013, was intended to launch a shared universe if successful. Following the film's release, Warner Bros. announced a follow-up entitled Batman v Superman: Dawn of Justice (2016), establishing the DCEU. A slate of 11 DCEU films were then announced in 2014.

In 2016, Warner Bros. established DC Films after the poor critical reception of Batman v Superman. The division, led by Geoff Johns and Jon Berg, was to oversee production and form a cohesive creative direction for the DCEU. After the failure of Justice League (2017), Johns and Berg were replaced by Walter Hamada in 2018. The DCEU expanded to television with the release of Peacemaker (2022–present) on HBO Max.

Discovery Inc. completed its acquisition of DC and Warner Bros. parent company WarnerMedia in 2022, forming a new company named Warner Bros. Discovery (WBD) with David Zaslav as CEO. Zaslav sought to overhaul the DCEU, and began searching for a creative leader akin to Marvel Studios president Kevin Feige to lead DC's film and television projects. James Gunn and Peter Safran were subsequently announced as the co-chairmen and CEOs of DC Studios, the successor to DC Films. In 2023, the duo unveiled their slate of ten DC projects which were to be part of the DC Universe (DCU), a soft reboot and spiritual successor to the DCEU.

Films

Man of Steel (2013) 

Kal-El / Clark Kent, who arrived on Earth years ago as an infant from Krypton, struggles with why he was sent to Earth. Raised by his adoptive parents, Jonathan and Martha Kent, Clark adopts the persona "Superman", and learns if his abilities are meant to maintain peace or conquer the world.

During story discussions for The Dark Knight Rises (2012), David S. Goyer told Christopher Nolan his idea regarding how to present Superman in a modern context. Impressed with Goyer's concept, Nolan pitched the idea to the studio, who hired Nolan to produce and Goyer to write based on the financial and critical success of The Dark Knight (2008). In October 2010, Zack Snyder was hired to direct the film, and Henry Cavill was cast as Clark Kent / Superman in January 2011. Principal photography began in August 2011. Man of Steel was released in North America on June 14, 2013.

Batman v Superman: Dawn of Justice (2016) 

Gotham City-based vigilante Batman travels to Metropolis to preemptively combat Superman, fearing what would happen if the latter is kept unchecked, while another threat endangers humankind.

By June 2013, Warner Bros. were fast-tracking a sequel to Man of Steel, with Snyder and Goyer returning as director and writer, respectively. Nolan was involved in an advisory role as executive producer. The sequel included Batman in a main role, and serves as a reboot of the Batman film series. Cavill, Amy Adams, Diane Lane, and Laurence Fishburne reprised their Man of Steel roles, while Ben Affleck was cast as Bruce Wayne / Batman. Chris Terrio was hired to rewrite Goyer's script. Originally scheduled to be released in July 2015, the release date was changed to May 6, 2016, to give the filmmakers "time to realize fully their vision, given the complex visual nature of the story". The film's title was revealed to be Batman v Superman: Dawn of Justice. Initial filming occurred on October 19, 2013, at East Los Angeles College, before full principal photography began in May 2014 and concluded that December. Production took place in Detroit, Illinois, New Mexico, Africa and the South Pacific. After another date change, the film was released in North America on March 25, 2016.

Batman v Superman: Dawn of Justice is set 18 months after the events of Man of Steel. The film introduces Gal Gadot as Diana Prince / Wonder Woman, Ezra Miller as Barry Allen / The Flash, Jason Momoa as Arthur Curry / Aquaman, Ray Fisher as Victor Stone / Cyborg, and Joe Morton as Dr. Silas Stone. Steppenwolf, who serves as the main antagonist in Justice League (2017), was introduced through a brief scene not included in the film's theatrical release but instead revealed online by Warner Bros. on March 28, before being included in the Ultimate Edition home video release.

Suicide Squad (2016) 

After Superman's death, a secret government agency recruits imprisoned supervillains to execute dangerous black ops missions and rescue the world from a powerful threat, in exchange for clemency.

In February 2009, prior to the development of the DCEU, Warner Bros. was developing a Suicide Squad film, with Dan Lin producing and Justin Marks writing the script. Warner Bros. announced Suicide Squad in October 2014, with David Ayer as director, also serving as screenwriter. The main cast included Will Smith, Margot Robbie, Jared Leto, Jai Courtney, Jay Hernandez, Adewale Akinnuoye-Agbaje, Karen Fukuhara, Cara Delevingne, Viola Davis, and Joel Kinnaman. Principal photography took place from April to August 2015 in Toronto. Suicide Squad was released in North America on August 5, 2016.

Suicide Squad is set after the events of Batman v Superman: Dawn of Justice. Affleck and Miller reprise their roles as Bruce Wayne / Batman and Barry Allen / The Flash from that film. In a mid-credits scene, Amanda Waller (portrayed by Davis) meets Wayne in a restaurant and hands him a dossier containing information on future members of the Justice League.

Wonder Woman (2017) 

Diana of Themyscira, an Amazon warrior who is also the demigoddess daughter of the god Zeus, uses her talents and abilities in order to help humanity during World War I.

In December 2013, Gal Gadot was cast as Diana Prince / Wonder Woman and signed a three-picture deal which included a solo film. The film was announced in October 2014, and Michelle MacLaren was confirmed to direct from a screenplay by Jason Fuchs the next month. MacLaren left the project the following year in April due to creative differences, and Patty Jenkins was hired to replace her. Filming occurred from November 2015 to May 2016 and took place in the United Kingdom, France and Italy. Wonder Woman was released in North America on June 2, 2017.

Justice League (2017) 

Motivated by Superman's death at the hands of Doomsday, Batman and Wonder Woman assemble a team of metahumans to stop the threat of Steppenwolf, who is in search of three Mother Boxes scattered across Earth.

By June 2013, Goyer was set to write Justice League as part of a three-film deal he signed for Man of Steel. Snyder was confirmed to return as director in April 2014, and the film was announced in October as Justice League Part One. In 2016, Chris Terrio was revealed to have written the script, and the title was changed to simply Justice League by June. Affleck, Cavill, Gadot, Momoa, Miller, and Fisher reprised their respective roles from previous films. Filming took place from April to October 2016 at Warner Bros. Studios, Leavesden in England, as well as locations around London and in Iceland. In May 2017, Snyder stepped down from his duties on the film due to his daughter's death; Joss Whedon filled his position on post-production, with additional scenes being written and directed by him. Though Whedon was not officially credited for his role as post-production director, he completed enough additional work for a screenwriting credit on the film. Justice League was released worldwide on November 17, 2017.

Reprising their roles from previous films are Jeremy Irons as Alfred Pennyworth, Diane Lane as Martha Kent, Amy Adams as Lois Lane, Jesse Eisenberg as Lex Luthor, Connie Nielsen as Hippolyta, Robin Wright as Antiope, and Joe Morton as Silas Stone. Justice League also introduces J. K. Simmons as James Gordon, Amber Heard as Mera, and Billy Crudup as Henry Allen, with Joe Manganiello appearing as Slade Wilson / Deathstroke in a post-credits scene.

Zack Snyder's Justice League (2021) 

The divisive reaction to the theatrical cut of Justice League, with Snyder leaving directorial duties and the final cut of the film in the hands of Whedon, led to a fan-driven campaign for a "Snyder Cut" of the film. Arguments were made that Snyder's vision would be more cohesive to the previous films. In March 2019, Snyder confirmed his original cut does exist, and stated that it was up to Warner Bros. to release it. Warner Bros. remained silent regarding the matter, though Variety reported in November that Warner Bros. was unlikely to release Snyder's version of Justice League, with one studio insider describing it as "a pipe dream". Snyder announced in May 2020 that HBO Max would be releasing his cut of Justice League on their service on March 18, 2021. Initially conceived as a four-part miniseries, it was ultimately released as a four-hour film, twice the length of the theatrical version. Snyder stated this version is intended to not affect the future of the DCEU continuity, but that it takes place in a slightly alternate universe. The new cut cost an estimated $70 million to complete, primarily for visual effects and additional photography. Some actors returned to their roles for the additional photography. Work on the cut was completed in January 2021.

Characters in the film who did not appear in the theatrical version include the Joker (with Jared Leto reprising the role from Suicide Squad), General Swanwick / Martian Manhunter (with Harry Lennix reprising the role from Man of Steel and Batman v Superman: Dawn of Justice), Darkseid (portrayed by Ray Porter), DeSaad (portrayed by Peter Guinness), Nuidis Vulko (portrayed by Willem Dafoe), Iris West (portrayed by Kiersey Clemons), Ryan Choi (portrayed by Zheng Kai), several Green Lanterns, as well as Granny Goodness.

Aquaman (2018) 

Arthur Curry, a half-Atlantean assistant lighthouse keeper, sets out to lead the underwater kingdom of Atlantis against his half-brother, King Orm, who seeks to unite the seven underwater kingdoms against the surface world.

Jason Momoa was cast as Arthur Curry / Aquaman in June 2014. By August, Will Beall and Kurt Johnstad were writing competing scripts for the character's solo film. Aquaman was announced in October. James Wan was hired as director the following year, as well as to oversee the screenplay by Johnstad. David Leslie Johnson was later brought to write a new script. Beall returned to write the script, based on a story treatment by Wan and Geoff Johns. Johnson worked on a rewrite of Beall's script with Wan and producer Peter Safran. Principal photography began in May 2017 in Queensland, Australia and wrapped that October. Aquaman was released in North America on December 21, 2018.

Aquaman is set after the events of Justice League, though critics have noticed numerous inconsistencies between the two theatrically released films. Furthermore, Momoa claimed that the film takes place after "Zack's cut", with the ending of that version of the film directly tying into the events of Aquaman. Heard reprises her role as Mera from Justice League, while Dafoe is introduced as Nuidis Vulko.

Shazam! (2019) 

By speaking "Shazam", Billy Batson, a 14-year-old foster child, can turn into an adult superhero, courtesy of an ancient wizard. He attempts to master his powers and defeat the evil forces controlled by Dr. Thaddeus Sivana.

In August 2014, Dwayne Johnson announced his attachment to a project about the superhero Shazam, formerly known as Captain Marvel. Johnson was revealed to be portraying the antihero Black Adam, Shazam's nemesis in the film, with Darren Lemke set to write the script in September. In October, Warner Bros. announced Shazam as a film in its upcoming slate. By January 2017, Henry Gayden was working on the script. In July, David F. Sandberg was hired to direct Shazam!. Johnson was dropped from the project, instead starring in a Black Adam solo film. By October, Zachary Levi was cast as Shazam, and in November, Asher Angel was cast as Shazam's child-age alter ego, Billy Batson. Principal photography began in January 2018 and wrapped that May, with most of the filming taking place at Pinewood Toronto Studios, among other locations around Toronto. Shazam! was released in North America on April 5, 2019.

Shazam! is set after the events of Justice League. Superman makes a cameo appearance at the end of the film, but his face is not shown as Henry Cavill was unable to reprise the role due to scheduling conflicts. The villain Mister Mind is introduced in a mid-credits scene.

Birds of Prey (2020) 

When Cassandra Cain, a young girl, comes across a diamond belonging to crime lord Black Mask, Harley Quinn joins forces with Black Canary, Huntress, and Renee Montoya to help protect her.

By November 2016, a film based on the female superhero team Birds of Prey was in development, with Christina Hodson signed on as screenwriter. By April 2018, Warner Bros. selected Cathy Yan as director, with Margot Robbie, Sue Kroll, and Bryan Unkless serving as producers. Margot Robbie reprised her role as Harley Quinn from Suicide Squad. The film is the first theatrical R-rated installment in the DCEU and has a smaller budget than most of the other films. In addition to Robbie's starring role, the cast also includes Mary Elizabeth Winstead, Jurnee Smollett-Bell, Rosie Perez, and Ella Jay Basco. The full title of the film was revealed as Birds of Prey (and the Fantabulous Emancipation of One Harley Quinn) by Robbie. Principal photography commenced in January 2019 in Los Angeles and lasted until April. Birds of Prey held its world premiere in London on January 29, 2020, and was later released in North America on February 7.

Birds of Prey is set after the events of Suicide Squad.

Wonder Woman 1984 (2020) 

Diana Prince comes into conflict with the Soviet Union during the Cold War in the 1980s and finds two formidable foes in the form of Maxwell Lord and Cheetah.

By June 2017, Geoff Johns and Patty Jenkins had begun work on the story treatment for a Wonder Woman sequel. In July, Johns was working on the script, and the sequel was officially announced at San Diego Comic-Con, with Gadot reprising the lead role. In September, Jenkins signed a deal to return as director, and brought on David Callaham to pen the script with her and Johns. Production began in June 2018 and concluded that December. Filming locations included the District of Columbia, Northern Virginia, Warner Bros. Studios, Leavesden in the United Kingdom and the islands of Tenerife and Fuerteventura in Spain. Wonder Woman 1984  was released in the United States on HBO Max and in theaters simultaneously on December 25, 2020.

In a mid-credits scene, Lynda Carter, who starred as Wonder Woman in a 1970s television series, is introduced as Asteria, a legendary Amazon warrior who possessed ancient golden armor that Gadot's Wonder Woman wears in the film.

The Suicide Squad (2021) 

Amanda Waller sends a new Task Force X, consisting of both old and new members, on a mission to destroy a Nazi-era laboratory containing experiments.

In March 2016, a Suicide Squad sequel was announced to be in development, with Ayer returning as director. Adam Cozad was hired to write the script by March 2017. By July, a new story treatment was written by Zak Penn. In September, Gavin O'Connor was hired as director and writer after Ayer dropped out. O'Connor completed the script with David Bar Katz and Todd Stashwick by September 2018. The next month, O'Connor left the project as Warner Bros. believed the script was too similar to Birds of Prey. In 2019, the film was re-titled The Suicide Squad, with James Gunn directing, from a new script he wrote. Gunn chose the project over various other films Warner Bros. had in development, including a Superman film. In March, Idris Elba joined the cast. He was initially hired to replace Smith as Deadshot, who dropped out due to scheduling conflicts, but was later decided that Elba would play a new character so Smith could return in the future. Robbie, Kinnaman, Courtney, and Davis reprise their roles from Suicide Squad. Production began in September 2019 at Pinewood Atlanta Studios in Atlanta, with additional filming following in Panama, and concluded in February 2020. The Suicide Squad began its international release on July 30, 2021, in the United Kingdom, and was released theatrically and on the streaming platform HBO Max in the United States on August 5.

Black Adam (2022) 

Nearly 5,000 years after he was bestowed with the powers of the Egyptian gods and imprisoned, Black Adam is freed from his tomb, ready to unleash his form of justice on the modern world.

In September 2014, after being considered to play Shazam and Lobo, Dwayne Johnson was cast as Black Adam, a central villain of DC's Shazam franchise. The character was intended to be introduced in Shazam!, but Johnson convinced the film's production studios to divide the narrative to focus on Black Adam's origin, with Black Adam and Shazam instead set to cross paths in a future film. Adam Sztykiel was hired as screenwriter. Jaume Collet-Serra was hired as director in June 2019, with Johnson, Beau Flynn, Hiram Garcia, and Dany Garcia attached as producers. By September 2020, Rory Haines and Sohrab Noshirvani had written a new draft of the script. Filming began in April 2021 and wrapped that July. Black Adam was released in the United States on October 21, 2022.

The film features the Justice Society of America, consisting of Aldis Hodge as Hawkman, Noah Centineo as Atom Smasher, Quintessa Swindell as Cyclone, and Pierce Brosnan as Doctor Fate. Reprising their roles from previous DCEU media are Davis as Amanda Waller, Djimon Hounsou as the wizard Shazam, and Jennifer Holland as Emilia Harcourt, with Henry Cavill appearing as Kal-El / Clark Kent / Superman in a mid-credits scene.

Shazam! Fury of the Gods (2023) 

A sequel to Shazam! entered development in April 2019, with Henry Gayden returning as writer. David F. Sandberg and Peter Safran were later confirmed to return as director and producer, respectively, and Chris Morgan was hired as an additional screenwriter. Zachary Levi reprises his role as the titular superhero, as most of the adult and child cast in the Shazam Family. At DC FanDome in August 2020, the film's title was announced as Shazam! Fury of the Gods. Filming began in May 2021 in Atlanta and concluded that August. Shazam! Fury of the Gods is scheduled to be released in the United States on March 17, 2023.

In January 2023, co-CEOs of DC Studios James Gunn and Peter Safran stated that Shazam! Fury of the Gods will lead right into the events of The Flash.

Upcoming films

The Flash (2023) 

Barry Allen attempts to go back in time to prevent his mother's murder which brings unintentional consequences to his timeline.

By July 2013, Greg Berlanti was developing a film that centered around Barry Allen / The Flash, and drafted a script alongside Geoff Johns, Chris Brancato, Michael Green, and Marc Guggenheim. In October 2014, Warner Bros. announced The Flash with a scheduled 2018 release date, and that Ezra Miller had been cast in the starring role. A new story treatment was being written by Phil Lord and Christopher Miller the following year in April. Over the next two years, Seth Grahame-Smith and Rick Famuyiwa had individually dropped out as director due to creative differences with the studio. Joby Harold was hired to do a page-one rewrite of the script in January 2017, which previously had drafts written by Grahame-Smith and Famuyiwa. In July, the title for the film was changed to Flashpoint, based on the comic book storyline of the same name. Dan Mazeau was brought on as co-writer. In March 2018, John Francis Daley and Jonathan Goldstein were hired to co-direct. In 2019, following creative differences with the co-directors' work on the script, Miller was hired to co-write a new draft in collaboration with Grant Morrison. By July, Daley and Goldstein had left the project, while Andy Muschietti and Christina Hodson were hired to replace them as director and screenwriter, respectively. Barbara Muschietti and Michael Disco serve as producers. Filming began in April 2021, at Warner Bros. Studios, Leavesden in Hertfordshire, England, and wrapped that October. The Flash is scheduled to be released on June 16, 2023.

The Flash will explore the multiverse using the Speed Force and feature multiple superheroes, including Michael Keaton as Bruce Wayne / Batman (reprising his role from the 1989 film Batman and its 1992 sequel Batman Returns) and Sasha Calle as Supergirl. Ben Affleck also reprises his role as the DCEU version of Bruce Wayne / Batman. The film will also "restart" the DCEU, according to Barbara Muschietti. Michael Shannon and Antje Traue will reprise their roles as General Zod and Faora-Ul, respectively, from Man of Steel, with Ron Livingston replacing Billy Crudup in the role of Henry Allen, Barry's father, who appeared in Justice League and its director's cut, and Kiersey Clemons returning as Iris West from the latter cut.

In January 2023, co-CEOs of DC Studios James Gunn and Peter Safran stated that The Flash will "reset" the DC Universe and lead right into the events of Blue Beetle, Aquaman and the Lost Kingdom, and their future slate of films given the subtitle of: "Chapter 1: Gods and Monsters". Gunn later explained that The Flash will change some aspects and characters, but not every aspect of the franchise that came before.

Blue Beetle (2023) 

In November 2018, a film centered on the Jaime Reyes incarnation of Blue Beetle was in development, with a script written by Gareth Dunnet-Alcocer. By February 2021, Angel Manuel Soto signed on as director, and Xolo Maridueña was cast as the titular character in August. John Rickard will serve as producer. Principal photography commenced in May in Atlanta, and wrapped on July 18 in Puerto Rico. Initially developed as an HBO Max exclusive film, Blue Beetle was later changed to a theatrical release, scheduled for August 18, 2023.

In January 2023, co-CEOs of DC Studios James Gunn and Peter Safran stated that Blue Beetle directly follows the events of The Flash where much of the franchise will be "reset".

Aquaman and the Lost Kingdom (2023) 

In January 2019, Warner Bros. confirmed development of an Aquaman sequel, with intentions for James Wan to return as director. In addition to starring, Momoa has a larger creative role in the sequel; together with his writing partner Thomas Pa'a Sibbett, he pitched their idea for the sequel to Warner Bros. and co-wrote the first story treatment. In February, David Leslie Johnson-McGoldrick signed on as screenwriter; he completed the script alongside Wan. Producer Peter Safran has stated that the film will explore the other Seven Kingdoms of Atlantis. The title was announced as Aquaman and the Lost Kingdom. Filming occurred from June 2021 to January 2022 in the United Kingdom, Hawaii and Los Angeles. Aquaman and the Lost Kingdom is scheduled to be released on December 25, 2023.

Ben Affleck reprises his DCEU role as Bruce Wayne / Batman.

In January 2023, co-CEOs of DC Studios James Gunn and Peter Safran stated that Aquaman and the Lost Kingdom will take place following the "reset" of the timeline of the DC film by The Flash, and that it will be directly followed by the slate of projects given the subtitle of: "Chapter 1: Gods and Monsters", mentioning the "true start" to occur in 2025.

Other potential films 
The following were films in various stages of development prior to the creation of DC Studios in November 2022.

  In August 2021, an HBO Max-exclusive film centered around Dinah Lance / Black Canary was announced to be in development with Jurnee Smollett reprising her role from Birds of Prey, Misha Green writing the script, and Sue Kroll producing. In June 2022, Smollett said that development on the project continued.
  In December 2016, a film centered around Floyd Lawton / Deadshot was announced to be in development, with Will Smith reprising his role from Suicide Squad. In February 2019, Smith left due to scheduling conflicts, and by April, the character was written out of The Suicide Squad in order to allow Smith an opportunity to return in a future film. As of April 2022, production on the film has been delayed in favor of other projects due to the production payroll that Smith had requested.
 The Flash sequel: In October 2022, it was revealed that the script for a sequel to The Flash had already been completed by David Leslie Johnson-McGoldrick, although the project's realization depends on the success of the first film.
  A film based on the Gotham City Sirens (a team consisting of Harley Quinn, Catwoman, and Poison Ivy) was announced to be in development in December 2016, with Ayer signed on as director and co-producer from a script by Geneva Robertson-Dworet. Robbie and Leto were set to reprise their roles of Quinn and the Joker from Suicide Squad, with Robbie also taking the role of an executive producer. The film's development was later postponed in favor of Birds of Prey. In January 2020, Ayer confirmed that the project was still on hold, and Robbie stated that she chose to film Birds of Prey first to introduce audiences to lesser-known characters. She said that she was still "pushing" forward with Gotham City Sirens, and hopes to explore the relationship of Quinn with Ivy and Catwoman. In 2022, Robbie stated that there were plans for the character to return in the franchise, and that she was continuing to advocate for a romantic relationship to be portrayed between Quinn and Ivy.
  In March 2021, a film focused on the character of Hourman, written by Gavin James and Neil Widener was reported to be in development.
  In September 2009, Warner Bros. announced that a film centered around Lobo was in development. Guy Ritchie and Brad Peyton were attached to direct at different times, while Dwayne Johnson was originally intended to star. After various iterations, in 2016, Jason Fuchs was hired as screenwriter. By February 2018, Warner Bros. was in discussions with Michael Bay to direct. Fuchs began rewriting the script at Bay's request so the budget could be considerably lowered. In November 2022, Jason Momoa stated that under the direction of Gunn and Safran, a project that he categorized as a "dream come true" was being developed, which included his favorite comic book character. The project was later reported to be Lobo. In January 2023, Gunn and Safran addressed Momoa's involvement with future adaptations of the character, while stating that the actor would not portray two characters in the franchise.
  In April 2007, a film centered around the Metal Men entered development with Eric Champnella as screenwriter; Lauren Shuler Donner and Jack Leslie also joined as producers. In May 2012, Barry Sonnenfeld entered negotiations with Warner Bros. to direct the film and was hired the next month. DC Entertainment president Diane Nelson reiterated in 2013 the company's intentions to make the film. The development was in limbo for several years until October 2021, when Sonnenfeld revealed that the film's story was still being written. In November 2022, Gunn confirmed that he and Safran had plans for the team in the future of the franchise.
  By February 2017, a film centered around Dick Grayson / Nightwing was in development, with Chris McKay and Bill Dubuque signed on as director and screenwriter, respectively. Although the script was nearing its final draft, McKay stated in June 2021 that the project had been delayed due to DC having "other priorities", but also reaffirmed his intentions to still make the film. He also said that the film could possibly be reworked to remove its connections to the DCEU continuity.
  By December 2018, a comedy-action adventure film based on Plastic Man was in development with Amanda Idoko hired to write the script. In December 2020, Cat Vasko was hired to do a rewrite of Idoko's screenplay, with the project reworked to be a female-centered film.
  At DC FanDome held in August 2020, a live-action film centered around Static was revealed to be in development, with Michael B. Jordan joining the production team as a producer alongside Reginald Hudlin in October. Walter Hamada described the film as a project that could be developed as an HBO Max-exclusive film. In March 2021, Randy McKinnon was hired as screenwriter.
  By November 2018, Warner Bros. was considering developing a film based on Zatanna. In March 2021, an AT&T investor presentation revealed that a Zatanna project was in development as an HBO Max-exclusive film, and Emerald Fennell was hired as screenwriter later that month. The film was going to be produced by J. J. Abrams. By October 2022, the film was initially scrapped at HBO Max, but later began being shopped around to other streaming services.

 Television series 

 Peacemaker (2022–present) 

Task Force X member Christopher Smith / Peacemaker is sent on a black-ops mission to target "butterflies", individuals possessed by parasitic, insect-like creatures invading the human race.

By September 2020, a television series spin-off of The Suicide Squad centered on Peacemaker was in development for HBO Max. James Gunn served as an executive producer alongside Peter Safran, wrote its eight episodes and directed several of them. John Cena reprises his role as Peacemaker from the film. Filming began in Vancouver, Canada in January 2021 and concluded that July. The first three episodes of Peacemaker were released on January 13, 2022, with subsequent episodes releasing weekly until February 17. Soon after the series ended, the series was renewed for a second season, with Gunn set to write and direct every episode.

The first season of Peacemaker is set five months after the events of The Suicide Squad, with Steve Agee and Jennifer Holland reprising their respective roles as John Economos and Emilia Harcourt from that film. Viola Davis, Jason Momoa, and Ezra Miller also make uncredited appearances as their respective DCEU roles of Amanda Waller, Arthur Curry / Aquaman, and Barry Allen / Flash, with Superman and Wonder Woman also appearing portrayed by stand-ins, with their faces obscured by the darkness. The series contains references to the wider DC universe, including confirmation that Bat-Mite, Doll Man, Matter-Eater Lad, Kite Man, and Green Arrow exist in the DCEU. Additionally, a newspaper headline detailing the Intergang can be briefly seen, ahead of their debut in Black Adam.

After the second season was ordered following the positive reactions garnered by the series, with the show's creator James Gunn confirmed to write and direct all planned episodes, and John Cena set to reprise the title role, Gunn stated that the new season would explore the greater ramifications from the aftermath of the first season's events. Following the surprise cancellation of the HBO Max film Batgirl in August 2022, Gunn reaffirmed that Peacemaker second season was "safe" and would continue development. Later in the same month he stated that filming was scheduled to begin in 2023, but in January 2023 Gunn said that the second season was delayed as he was busy working on other projects.

 Other series in development 
 Untitled John Constantine series: In February 2021, a series focusing on John Constantine entered development at HBO Max. The series, featuring a young Constantine in contemporary London, was planned to be horror-oriented and would tie in with Justice League Dark. Guy Bolton was hired to write the pilot, while J. J. Abrams would serve as executive producer. The creatives involved are determined to have a diverse cast pool, while looking to the non-white actors for the lead role. By August 2022, the series was still in development, while also tentatively scheduled to begin production in early-2023. In September, after four episodes of the series were written, the series was no longer moving forward at HBO Max in favor of developing of a sequel to the film Constantine (2005). In October, the series was confirmed to still be in development and being shopped around to other streaming services.
  In June 2021, a series focusing on Madame Xanadu entered development at HBO Max. Angela Robinson was planned to write and executive produce the series along with J.J. Abrams. The series was planned to tie in with Justice League Dark. By September 2022, the project was dropped by HBO Max and was being shopped around to other streaming services.
 Untitled Val-Zod series: By July 2021, a limited series centered around Val-Zod was in development for HBO Max. Michael B. Jordan is set to produce the series and also potentially star, while Darnell Metayer and Josh Peters will serve as writers. Jordan had previously pitched a feature film centered around an African-American Superman, only to place development on hold due to his busy production schedule.

 Canceled and reworked projects 
Over the years, many projects that were at one point supposed to be part of the DCEU have either been moved into a different continuity, outright canceled, or unreleased:
  In March 2017, Joss Whedon was hired to write, direct and produce a film centered around Barbara Gordon / Batgirl. Whedon was to begin production on the film in 2018, but stepped down in February. In April, Christina Hodson was hired as the screenwriter for Batgirl. By November 2019, Hodson was expected to write the script once she had completed work on The Flash. In May 2021, Adil El Arbi and Bilall Fallah were announced as the film's co-directors, with Kristin Burr serving as producer. In July, Leslie Grace was cast in the titular role. Principal photography began in Glasgow in November 2021, and wrapped by the end of March 2022. Batgirl was scheduled to be released sometime in 2022 on HBO Max, though it was reportedly being reconsidered for theatrical release by Warner Bros. Discovery by April. That August, Warner Bros. Discovery cancelled the plans to release the film on HBO Max or theatrically following poor test screenings. The film was deemed not "big" enough for the big screen yet too expensive to be released on HBO Max. Despite the project's cancellation, the studio still hoped to work with Arbi, Fallah and Grace on other DC projects. In January 2023, co-CEO of DC Studios Peter Safran commented that Zaslav had made the right decision with cancelling the project, while providing positive statements regarding its creative team he stated that it was "not releasable". Safran elaborated that "it would not have been able to compete in the theatrical marketplace; it was built for the small screen". The studio however looks to reintroduce the character elsewhere in the franchise, while also intending to work with Arbi and Fallah in the future.
 Ben Afflecks  In July 2015, Ben Affleck was in negotiations to direct, produce, star in, and co-write (with Geoff Johns) a Batman film. Affleck was confirmed as the film's director at the San Diego Comic-Con 2016. Affleck stepped down as director in January 2017, and Matt Reeves was hired to direct and co-produce the film the next month. Under Reeves, the film shifted focus towards a younger, more inexperienced iteration of the character while drawing more from the comics' roots in noir and detective fiction, and Affleck eventually left the project altogether, being replaced by Robert Pattinson as Batman and allowing the film to drop its connections to the DCEU, establishing it in a new standalone universe.
  In December 2022, it was reported that a Batman Beyond film starring Michael Keaton was in development, with a script by Christina Hodson. The plot would have involved an aged Bruce Wayne, continuing the plot threads from his appearance in The Flash, and would have included Catwoman. Development on the film was shelved after Gunn and Safran were appointed as co-heads of DC Studios. In January 2023, Gunn and Safran stated that there is potential for a future multiverse project in which they may incorporate Keaton's incarnation of Batman.Untitled Black Adam sequel: In April 2017, Johnson stated that DC Films planned on Black Adam and Shazam appearing in a future film together. In October 2022, Johnson confirmed future plans for Black Adam to fight Superman in the DCEU, and reaffirmed plans for the character to crossover with Shazam. That month, producers Hiram Garcia and Beau Flynn stated that the sequel was in development, with plans to fast-track production on the project. Johnson publicly announced that December that the character would not be a part of the initial slate of projects lined up for the new DC film universe under Gunn and Safran. He added that both DC Studios and his production company Seven Bucks Productions would continue collaborating in the future, and that the studio intended to "continue exploring the most valuable ways Black Adam can be utilized in future DC multiverse chapters".
 Untitled Crisis on Infinite Earths film: In August 2022, when the Warner Bros. Discovery merger was completed and Walter Hamada began preparations to leave his role as President of DC Films, it was reported that prior to these events Warner Bros. had been developing a project based on Crisis on Infinite Earths. The plot would have similarly incorporated the multiverse and iterations of the main characters from alternate realities. Following Hamada's departure from the studios, the project's future realization is dependent on Gunn and Safran's plans for the franchise.
  In April 2014, Ray Fisher was cast as Victor Stone / Cyborg, and Warner Bros. announced a film centered around the character was in development the following October. Joe Morton was set to reprise his role as Dr. Silas Stone. Morton commented that there were discussions to include scenes involving Cyborg that were cut during post-production on the theatrical release of Justice League. Fisher expressed his desire for Zack Snyder to direct the film. Cyborg was scheduled to be released on April 3, 2020, but was later delayed. In April 2020, Fisher confirmed that development on the project continued; though by 2021, amidst a dispute between the actor and Warner Bros. Pictures regarding an investigation in the reshoot process on Justice League, he stated that he would not play the role in any film that had Hamada's involvement. DC Films stated that they would not recast the role. Fisher later commented that he would only reprise the role if Snyder's canceled Justice League sequel was to be revived. In March, Fisher said that he is not opposed to reprising the role in future DCEU films, with the actor preferring Cyborg to be directed by Snyder or Rick Famuyiwa. In February 2022, when discussing the Justice League's appearance in the final episode of Peacemaker, Gunn stated that Cyborg did not appear in the scene due to the studio's planned "future" with the character.
  In October 2017, a film centered around Slade Wilson / Deathstroke was announced to be in development with Gareth Evans attached as screenwriter and director from a story by Joe Manganiello, who was also set to reprise his role from Justice League. The project was greenlit after Evans impressed executives with his pitch. By April 2020, Evans was no longer in negotiations to work on the project, stating that he had never been contractually involved with its development. He described the story as a "dark" and "unforgiving" origin story, similar to Korean noir films. In March 2021, after numerous delays, Manganiello confirmed that Deathstroke had been canceled because Warner Bros. did not consider it a priority. The project was brought back in discussions to revive it as part of Gunn and Safran's plans for the future of the DCEU in December 2022.
  Originally, the 2011 Green Lantern film was planned to be the first film in a shared DC cinematic universe, but its planned sequels were canceled in September 2011 and the film was eventually left out of continuity due to its critical and financial disappointment. The film was eventually established retroactively to be set within the multiverse of DC media, designated as Earth-12 in the Arrowverse crossover event "Crisis on Infinite Earths".
  In July 2017, a film featuring Harley Quinn and the Joker was announced to be in development with the working title of Harley Quinn vs. the Joker, scheduled to begin production after The Suicide Squad. Glenn Ficarra and John Requa were hired as co-writers, co-directors, and co-producers. In September 2018, Ficarra and Requa said that the script was completed and submitted to Warner Bros., and that production would commence after Birds of Prey. The film was canceled by February 2019.
 Untitled Joker film: In June 2018, a film featuring the Joker entered development. Jared Leto would have served as an executive producer in addition to reprising his role as the Joker, as well as being involved with hiring the film's production crew. By February 2019, the film had been canceled, and a Joker film unrelated to the DCEU was released later that year.
 Untitled Justice League sequel: In October 2014, Justice League Part Two was announced, with Snyder returning as director. Deborah Snyder later revealed that Justice League would not be one film split into two parts. The film was scheduled to be released on June 14, 2019, but production was pushed back to accommodate The Batman. Joss Whedon, the director of Justice League reshoots, would eventually rework one of the film's post-credit scenes in order to tease the Injustice League as villains of a possible sequel. In October 2017, J. K. Simmons stated that work on the script was in-progress, while in December, Variety reported that there were "no immediate plans" for Snyder to return as director. By 2019, Warner Bros. had prioritized standalone films over the project. WarnerMedia CEO Ann Sarnoff stated in March 2021 that Zack Snyder's Justice League was considered "a storytelling cul-de-sac" by the studio, with no sequels planned. In August, producer Charles Roven confirmed the studio's interest in a Justice League sequel, but added that it was still "a number of years away". A sequel was once again under consideration while De Luca and Abdy were in charge of DC Films, before Gunn and Safran took over.
  In January 2013, Guillermo del Toro began developing a film centered on the Justice League Dark and submitted a script in November the next year, but was no longer attached by June 2015. In August 2016, Doug Liman joined to direct with the title Dark Universe, alongside Scott Rudin producing and Michael Gilio rewriting the script. Liman left the following May due to scheduling conflicts. In mid-2017, it was retitled Justice League Dark with Gerard Johnstone polishing the script. By April 2020, the project was being redeveloped as a series for HBO Max, with J. J. Abrams serving as an executive producer. Justice League Dark was intended to premiere after the individual team members were introduced in their own series, with the studios involved inspired to a similar approach as Marvel Television's Netflix series individually premiering before crossing over in The Defenders (2017). By February 2023, the series was no longer moving forward.
  In October 2014, Man of Steel writer David S. Goyer was announced to be developing a television series focused on the planet Krypton. During the development, Goyer revealed that the series would use unused concepts for the planet that were created for Man of Steel. In early marketing materials for the series and the first teaser that debuted at the 2017 San Diego Comic-Con, the Superman logo designed for the DCEU films was used to represent the House of El, implying that the series would have been a direct prequel to Man of Steel. During the casting process, the production crew sought an actor who resembled a young Henry Cavill to portray Seg-El, Superman's grandfather, while Goyer stated that the series was planned to take place 200 years prior to the events of Man of Steel. Ultimately, all connections to Man of Steel were dropped by the series' release in March 2018. Executive producer Cameron Welsh later described the series as "adjacent" to both the DCEU and the Arrowverse.
 Untitled Man of Steel sequel: By October 2014, a sequel to Man of Steel was in development, with Henry Cavill set to reprise his role. Matthew Vaughn had discussions with the studio to direct the film in 2017, but after two years, the talks with Warner Bros. ended in March and Vaughn left the film. Shortly after in July, Christopher McQuarrie said that he and Cavill had pitched a sequel idea to Warner Bros. over a year prior, with the plot having ties to Green Lantern Corps, but he moved on to other projects due to what he perceived as no movement on the films. Later, Michael B. Jordan had pitched his own take on the character, but was not ready to commit due to an already busy schedule. By November, Warner Bros. had entered negotiations with J. J. Abrams about taking control of the project. The film was no longer in active development by May 2020, but Cavill entered negotiations to reprise the role in a different film. Snyder later stated that his plans for the plot had included Brainiac and the Kryptonians who were banished to the Phantom Zone at the end of Man of Steel. In 2022, after Cavill reprised his role in Black Adam, a film centered around his iteration of Superman was back in active development, intended to serve as the first film focusing solely on the character since Man of Steel. Charles Roven was hired as producer at that time, with a story pitch written by Steven Knight. The studio was actively searching for a director. Cavill confirmed in October that he would reprise the role in multiple future installments. However, that December, while De Luca and Abdy had worked closely with Cavill to announce his return as Superman, Gunn and Safran instead opted to develop a film with the character at a younger age. Cavill confirmed that he would no longer play Superman.
  In March 2018, Ava DuVernay signed on to direct a film centered around the New Gods. Initially with a script written by Kario Salem, Tom King was later brought to co-write the film with DuVernay. Darkseid was planned to be the main antagonist of the film, and the Female Furies were set to appear. The fourth draft of the script was ongoing in 2020. In December, DuVernay said that the COVID-19 pandemic had given her and King time to dig into "the mind and musings of Jack Kirby". New Gods was canceled in April 2021, though Warner Bros. stated that it could be revived in the future. According to The Hollywood Reporter, the project faced difficulties due to Darkseid's role in Zack Snyder's Justice League, and Warner Bros. wanted time to pass before the character appeared again. Later, DuVernay revealed that Mister Miracle, Big Barda, Granny Goodness, and Highfather would have appeared in the film.
 Untitled Black Manta film: In February 2019, Warner Bros. announced a horror-themed spin-off from Aquaman focusing on the villainous Trench kingdom. Safran and James Wan were set to produce, with Noah Gardner and Aidan Fitzgerald writing the script. The film was planned to have a lower production budget than other DCEU films. The following month, Safran stated that he expected the film to be released before Aquaman and the Lost Kingdom. In April 2021, the project was canceled, though Warner Bros. said that it may be revived in the future. In October, Wan revealed that the initially announced name of The Trench was a working title, to misdirect the audience that the movie was secretly a Black Manta film.
 The Wonder Twins: In February 2022, a film centered around Zan and Jayne / the Wonder Twins entered development for HBO Max. Adam Sztykiel was slated to make his directorial debut and write the screenplay, with Marty Bowen and Wyck Godfrey serving as producers. By that April, KJ Apa and Isabel May were cast in the lead roles of Zan and Jayna, respectively. Principal photography was scheduled to commence in Atlanta, Georgia in July, but the project was canceled in May following WarnerMedia's merge with Discovery Inc. and the creation of Warner Bros. Discovery. The CEO of the newly formed conglomerate, David Zaslav, felt that the film's estimated $75 million-plus budget would not bolster enough of a return as a straight-to-streaming release. Additionally, Zaslav has a directive mandate that DC Films will first focus on theatrical releases, with internal criticism also stating that the project had been conceived in a style deemed "too niche".
 Untitled Wonder Woman 1984 sequel: After principal photography on Wonder Woman 1984 was completed, director and co-writer Patty Jenkins stated that the plot for a third Wonder Woman film had been written. She revealed that the story arc for Wonder Woman had been planned over three films, with the third taking place in the present. Jenkins and Gadot planned to work on other projects before proceeding with the sequel. In 2020, Jenkins said she had stories written for two more Wonder Woman films completed. Two days after 1984 was released, a third film was officially greenlit by Warner Bros. Pictures. Jenkins would have return as director, with a script she wrote, while Gadot was planned to reprise her role as the titular heroine. In October 2021, Gadot stated that Lynda Carter would reprise her role as Asteria from 1984. A year later, Jenkins revealed that the script for the film was completed, while also stating that she had tentative plans for further installments. Filming was expected to begin in mid-2023, but in December the third film was revealed to be no longer moving forward as-is because the script conflicted with the current plans for the DCEU formulated by Gunn and Safran. Jenkins later stated that the film could not happen under the new plans for DCEU by Gunn and Safran.

Expanded setting 

In October 2014, Geoff Johns explained that DC's approach to their films and television series would be different from Marvel Studios' cinematic universe, stating that their film universe and TV universes would be kept separate within a multiverse to allow "everyone to make the best possible product, to tell the best story, to do the best world". This divide lasted until January 2020, when the DCEU was retroactively established to have connections to The CW's Arrowverse continuity via an expansion of the multiverse concept, during Part 4 of the "Crisis on Infinite Earths" crossover. Ezra Miller reprised their role as Barry Allen in a cameo appearance alongside Grant Gustin's version of the character. During their conversation, Miller's Barry gets the idea to call himself "The Flash" from his alternate self and mentions "Victor". Despite their cameo, the episode did not confirm the designated Earth for the DCEU characters.

Miller's cameo opened up more possibilities for crossovers between DC films and the Arrowverse. President of DC Films, Walter Hamada, revealed that prior to "Crisis on Infinite Earths", DC had been structured in a way that the television division had to clear the use of characters with the film division. Now, the company could "really lean into this idea of [the multiverse] and acknowledge the fact there can be a Flash on TV and one in the movies, and you don't have to pick one or the other, and they both exist in this multiverse". Arrowverse creator and executive producer Greg Berlanti agreed, feeling that "moving forward, there's more opportunity to do more things like this", and was open to more film characters appearing in the Arrowverse.

In August 2020, Hamada announced plans to develop a multiverse inspired by the comics. In doing so, the studio also stated that all past, present, and future projects are a part of the same unified multiverse. The Flash director Andy Muschietti further explained that all previous adaptations of DC Comics were a part of the multiverse: "...all the cinematic iterations that we've seen before are valid... all that you've seen exists, and everything that you will see exists, in the same unified multiverse".

Timeline 
In the DCEU, the events of the films rarely explicitly make their exact years known. Man of Steel takes place after the events of Wonder Woman and Wonder Woman 1984, which are set in 1918 and 1984, respectively. Wonder Woman also has bookend scenes set in the present after the events of Batman v Superman: Dawn of Justice. The events of Batman v Superman occur 18 months after the events of Man of Steel, which follows the consequences and the emergence of aliens and metahumans such as Superman. The film concludes with the death of Superman, which is emphasized in Suicide Squad and Justice League, taking place approximately one and two years later, respectively.

Jason Momoa confirmed that Aquaman takes place right after Zack Snyder's Justice League. Aquaman is followed by Shazam!, which occurs during the Christmas season of 2018. Afterwards, the events of Birds of Prey are set in 2020, followed by The Suicide Squad, confirmed to take place in 2021. Peacemaker is set five months after the events of The Suicide Squad, followed by Black Adam and Shazam! Fury of the Gods, which set about two years after its predecessor.

Recurring cast and characters

Reception

Box office performance

Critical and public response

Accolades

Music

Soundtracks

Singles

Other media

Novels

Comics

Video games

Future 

In January 2023, Gunn and Safran announced the initial ten installments for the DC Universe, which make up a portion of the slate subtitled "Chapter 1: Gods and Monsters". They included the films Superman: Legacy (2025), The Authority, The Brave and the Bold, Supergirl: Woman of Tomorrow and Swamp Thing, as well as the television series Waller, Creature Commandos, Lanterns, Paradise Lost, and Booster Gold. The duo were open to DCEU actors such as Ezra Miller, Gal Gadot, Jason Momoa and Zachary Levi returning, though Gunn clarified that Superman: Legacy would serve as the start of the new continuity, with the DCU being able to change events from the DCEU, with the DCEU properties serving "like a rough memory of what happens in the DCU". The Flash film would be used to reset some aspects of the universe heading into the DCU.

See also 

 List of films based on DC Comics publications
 List of television series based on DC Comics publications
 DC Animated Universe
 DC Universe Animated Original Movies
 DC Universe
 Tomorrowverse

Notes

References

External links 

 
 DC Comics Movies
 DC Extended Universe Wiki

 
Continuity (fiction)
DC Comics franchises
Fictional universes
Film series introduced in 2013
Films based on DC Comics
DC Comics dimensions
Mass media franchises introduced in 2013
Warner Bros. franchises